Josiah Seton (born March 23, 1979) is a Liberian footballer (striker). He is a member of the Liberia national football team.

Seton previously played for Sabah FA in Malaysia.

References

External links 
 
 
 

1979 births
Living people
Liberian footballers
Sportspeople from Monrovia
Association football forwards
Expatriate footballers in Malaysia
Expatriate footballers in Indonesia
Expatriate soccer players in Canada
Sabah F.C. (Malaysia) players
Sri Pahang FC players
Bontang F.C. players
Thunder Bay Chill players
USL League Two players
Malaysia Super League players
Liga 1 (Indonesia) players
Liberian expatriate footballers
Liberian expatriate sportspeople in Indonesia
Liberian expatriate sportspeople in Canada
Liberian expatriate sportspeople in Malaysia
Liberia international footballers